Universo Latino was a Spanish pop channel on Sirius Satellite Radio channel 82 and Dish Network channel 6082. Until June 24, 2008, Universo Latino was on Sirius channel 90 and Dish Network channel 6090. Universo Latino retired as a result of the Sirius XM merger on November 12, 2008, and was replaced by the online-only Viva. In addition, Spanish pop music can now be heard on Sirius XM's Caliente, available on channel 83 on Sirius and channel 85 on XM.

See also
 List of Sirius Satellite Radio stations

References 

Sirius Satellite Radio channels
Defunct radio stations in the United States
Radio stations established in 2002
Radio stations disestablished in 2008